The British Bill of Rights can refer to:

 Bill of Rights 1689, an Act of the Parliament of England made following the Glorious Revolution; considered one of the fundamental parts of the Constitution of the United Kingdom
 Claim of Right Act 1689, an Act of the Parliament of Scotland that enacted the same principles as the Bill of Rights in England into Scottish law
 Proposed British Bill of Rights, a 2015 proposal to replace the Human Rights Act 1998 for the United Kingdom
 Bill of Rights Bill, a 2022 Bill that seeks to repeals and replaces the Human Rights Act 1998

See also
 Bill of rights